Kevin "Kasper" Cole is a fictional character appearing in American comic books published by Marvel Comics. The character is the third to use the name White Tiger. He has also adopted the moniker of the Black Panther. The character was created by Christopher Priest and Dan Fraga and introduced in Black Panther (vol. 3) #50.

Publication history
With sales numbers declining on the third volume of Black Panther, the decision was made to retool the series. The original character - T'Challa T'Chaka, the king of Wakanda - would be replaced with a new character impersonating the Black Panther, starting with issue #50. According to writer Christopher Priest, this would be 'some guy who starts this gig, essentially, as a scam, but who evolves over the course of time to embrace and appreciate the rich heritage and culture of the Lord of the Wakandas'.

In issue #50 of the Black Panther, Kevin "Kasper" Cole makes his first appearance. He is an officer in the narcotics division of the New York Police Department's Organized Crime Control Bureau (OCCB), looking to be promoted to homicide detective. He lives with his mother Ruth and his pregnant girlfriend Gwen in a squalid apartment in Harlem. His father "Black" Jack is a former cop that has been imprisoned on the charge of corruption.

The character was pitched by Priest as a 'dark satire of Spider-Man', in line with work he had done on DC Comics' Steel, who functioned similarly as a 'dysfunctional Superman'. The character of Kasper Cole and his friends and family therefore take many cues from Peter Parker and his supporting cast, with Kasper's mother Ruth correlating with Aunt May, his father Jack with Uncle Ben and his girlfriend Gwen with Gwen Stacy. Priest also drew inspiration from the film Training Day, as well as sitcom Everybody Loves Raymond.

The first storyline, "Black and White", running in issues #50 to #56, focuses on Kasper's investigation into the ties between his boss Sal Anthony and the criminal 66 Bridges gang. Suspended from the police force, he adopts the mantle of the Black Panther - stealing the costume from his Sergeant Tork, an ally of the Panther - so that he can gather evidence. This brings him into conflict with Nigel "Triage" Blacque (who leads 66 Bridges) and the police department's Internal Affairs.

During the course of the investigation, Kasper also comes into contact with the original Black Panther, as well as the Panther's antagonist and half-brother the White Wolf (Hunter). They both attempt to manipulate him to their needs. Christopher Priest has described "Black and White" as being 'about a war between The Black Panther (T'Challa) and the "white panther" (Hunter) over the soul of this young kid'.

Before the story arc concludes, it is revealed to the reader that 66 Bridges is in fact led by Kasper's father as Kibuka (a plotline that has been left unresolved) and that Triage is his half-brother. Kasper does not succeed in taking down the gang, although he manages to expose a number of crooked cops. He has also struck a deal with his corrupt boss, who will help him take down 66 Bridges if Kasper locates his kidnapped son. This search is key to the final Black Panther story arc, "Ascension" (#59-62).

In order to find the child, Kasper makes a deal with T'Challa's nemesis Erik Killmonger, the then rightful holder of the Black Panther mantle. Given a synthetic version of the herbs that grant the Black Panther his powers, Kasper gains the enhanced skills necessary to locate the child. The arc and the series concludes with Kasper becoming a White Tiger, a sort of acolyte to the Black Panther cult, although he remains in Harlem.

Before the final Black Panther arc was finished, Kasper Cole was already designated as one of the feature characters in the short-lived The Crew (2003–2004, 7 issues). He makes his first regular appearance in issue #1 and as the new White Tiger in issue #2. His character provides narration (the only one to do so) for the second, fourth, (part of the) sixth and seventh (the final) issue. In the series, Kasper teams with James Rhodes (War Machine), Danny Vincente (Junta) and Josiah X in taking on Triage and the 66 Bridges Gang. While Kasper's relationship with the other characters is fraught with conflict, they nonetheless manage to defeat Triage.

After the conclusion of The Crew, he is referenced in the Civil War: Battle Damage Report one-shot. During Civil War II, Kasper is shown in attendance at James Rhodes' funeral after he is killed by Thanos.

Kasper is later shown retired from the world of superheroics, now focusing on his police career after having been kicked out of his apartment by Gwen. T'Challa convinces him to don the White Tiger suit one last time in order to stop Cardiac and Vanisher, the latter of whom has been smuggling stolen vibranium out of Wakanda. Later, T'Challa unveils a new costume for Kasper and says that he wants to train him properly to become a hero again, not as White Tiger or Black Panther, but in a new identity altogether.

Appearance

Kevin "Kasper" Cole is depicted as biracial, the child of an African man and a Jewish woman. As a result of the sharp contrast between his light skin and the dark skin of his father, he has been nicknamed Kasper, after Casper the Friendly Ghost. Aspects of his heritage and the colour of his skin are frequently referenced in Black Panther and The Crew.

Initially, Kasper Cole was to be modelled after actor Vin Diesel, an idea suggested by artist Oscar Jimenez. Language and culture barriers, as Priest describes it, precluded this suggestion from being properly translated to Jorge Lucas, who ended up as the penciller of the Black Panther title.

Power and abilities
Kasper Cole was initially non-powered, wearing only the Black Panther's outfit for protection and carrying a pair of 9×19mm pistols (later loaded with non-lethal gel bullets). Later on, after ingesting a synthetic version of the herbs that give the original Black Panther his powers, he possesses peak human physical strength, speed, reflexes and reactions, agility and durability, superhuman eyesight, and night vision.

The suit Kasper wears as the Black Panther and later as the White Tiger is a vibranium microweave body suit capable of dissipating the kinetic and hydrostatic shock damage of bullets or bullet-like objects, essentially making it bullet-proof. It also has special vibranium soled boots for scaling vertical surfaces. Anti-metal properties of the Antarctic vibranium in his claws and boots will break down any known metal including adamantium. Kasper also carries energy based throwing daggers capable of paralyzing or tagging his enemies. He can track those tagged via an advanced pocket computer (which also has numerous other capabilities), a Kimiyo Card.

References

External links

 
 World of Black Heroes: Kasper Cole Biography
 Digital Priest: White Tiger

African-American superheroes
Black Panther (Marvel Comics) characters
Black people in comics
Characters created by Christopher Priest
Comics characters introduced in 2002
Fictional American Jews in comics
Fictional New York City Police Department officers
Jewish superheroes
Marvel Comics male superheroes
Marvel Comics martial artists
Marvel Comics mutates
Marvel Comics superheroes
White Tiger (comics)